María Muñiz de Urquiza (born 5 August 1962, in Gijón) is Spanish member of the European Parliament. 

Muñiz de Urquiza is a graduate and doctorate (PhD) in political science and sociology. She also holds a postgraduate in European Community studies from the Diplomatic School, Ministry of Foreign Affairs. She has been a lecturer in international public law at the Charles III University of Madrid from 1989 to 1994.

In 1999, she was appointed Communications Secretary for PSOE-Europe, a post she held for a year. She has also worked as policy adviser to the Socialist Group in the European Parliament from 2004 to 2009. Her expertise was in external affairs and civil liberties. She was also an adviser for the Delegation for relations with the countries of Central America.

References

Spanish Socialist Workers' Party MEPs
Living people
1962 births
MEPs for Spain 2009–2014
Articles containing video clips